Springhill was a British soap opera created by Paul Abbott, produced by Granada Television, and broadcast from 1 October 1996 to 18 June 1997 on the Sky One satellite channel, and later on Channel 4. It consisted of 2 series, each containing 26 episodes.

Set in Liverpool, Springhill based its main theme on the battle between good and evil, entwined around a complex family drama. Issues covered included adoption revelation, genetic sexual attraction, bigamy, homosexuality, infertility, surrogacy and murder. Aside from this there was a supernatural aspect, which included elements of religion, Angels, apparitions, witchcraft, time travel and the Second Coming of Christ.

Cast
 Gilly Coman as Liz Freeman
 Jonathan Barlow as Jack Freeman
 Katharine Rogers as Eva Morrigan
 Scot Williams (series 1) and Stephen Donald (series 2) as Nick Freeman
 Sharon Byatt as Sue Freeman
 Christine Tremarco as Trish Freeman
 Kevin Knapman as Anthony Freeman
 Paul Culshaw as John Paul Freeman
 Stephen Walters (series 1) and Matthew Dunster (series 2) as Jamie Johnson
 Bill Speed as Father Peter McGinley
 Vickie Gates as Meryl Cartlege
 Crissy Rock as Anita Cartlege
 Samantha Lavelle as Pat Lombard
 Paul Warriner as Greg Metcalfe
 Emma Lucy Vaudrey as Greta Mullaney
 Claire Robinson as Debbie Nixon
 Judy Holt as Marian (series 2)

DVD releases
The first series of Springhill was released on Region 1 DVD on 18 June 2013. The second season has not had any official release.

References

External links
 
  School hosts TV film crew

1996 British television series debuts
1997 British television series endings
1990s British television soap operas
Sky UK original programming
British television soap operas
Channel 4 television dramas
Television series by ITV Studios
Television shows produced by Granada Television
Television shows written by Russell T Davies
LGBT culture in Liverpool
English-language television shows
British fantasy television series